As a nickname, Mighty Mouse may refer to:

 Eric Aiken (born 1980), American featherweight boxer and former IBF world champion
 Jimmy Alapag (born 1977), Philippine Basketball Association player
 Pam Barrett (1953–2008), Canadian politician
 Chuck Fenenbock (1917–1998), American National Football League and Canadian Football League player
 Shannon Gallant (born 1986), Australian rugby league player
 Demetrious Johnson (fighter) (born 1986), American mixed martial arts fighter and UFC Flyweight champion
 Kevin Keegan, English former footballer
 Tony Leswick (1923–2001), Canadian National Hockey League player
 Ian McLauchlan (born 1942), Scottish retired rugby union player
 Mark McMillian (born 1970), American retired National Football League player
 Kyla Ross (born 1996), American artistic gymnast
 Michael Russell (tennis) (born 1978), American tennis player
 Damon Stoudamire (born 1973), American retired National Basketball Association player
 Elaine Tanner (born 1951), Canadian retired swimmer
 Zhang Anda (born 1991), Chinese snooker player

See also 

 Vic Toweel (1928–2008), South African boxer and world champion nicknamed "Benoni's Mighty Mouse"
 Mouse (nickname)

Lists of people by nickname
Nicknames in sports
Nicknames in boxing